Zofingen District is a district in the Swiss canton of Aargau. It is located in the southwest corner of the Canton. The seat is Zofingen. The largest municipality in population is Oftringen, the smallest is Wiliberg.

Geography
Of this area,  or 39.4% is used for agricultural purposes, while  or 43.5% is forested. Of the rest of the land,  or 16.5% is settled (buildings or roads).

Demographics
, 20.4% of the population are foreign nationals.

Economy
 there were 30,570 workers who lived in the district.  Of these, 21,580 or about 70.6% of the residents worked outside the  Zofingen district while 16,514 people commuted into the district for work.  There were a total of 25,504 jobs (of at least 6 hours per week) in the district.

Religion
Of the rest of the population, there were 130 individuals (or about 0.22% of the population) who belonged to the Christian Catholic faith.

Education
Of the school age population, there are 4,351 students attending primary school, there are 1,689 students attending secondary school, there are 1,062 students attending tertiary or university level schooling, and there are 9 students who are seeking a job after school in the municipality.

Municipalities

Mergers
The following changes to the district's municipalities have occurred since 2000:

2002: Mühlethal merged into Zofingen
2019: Attelwil merged into Reitnau

References

Districts of Aargau